This article contains information about the literary events and publications of 1982.

Events
February 17 – Philip K. Dick ignores advice to go immediately to hospital. A fortnight later, after two strokes, he is pronounced brain-dead and disconnected from his life-support machine.
March 18 – A legal case brought on behalf of Mary Whitehouse against theater director Michael Bogdanov concerning alleged indecency in a performance of Howard Brenton's play The Romans in Britain at the National Theatre in London is dropped after the Attorney General intervenes.
June 25 – In Island Trees School District v. Pico, the Supreme Court of the United States concludes that "local school boards may not remove books from school library shelves simply because they dislike the ideas contained in those books and seek by their removal to 'prescribe what shall be orthodox in politics, nationalism, religion, or other matters of opinion.'"
September – Banned Books Week is instituted in the United States.
October 7 – After Sue Townsend's comic character Adrian Mole is introduced (as Nigel Mole, aged 13, living in the East Midlands of England) in a BBC Radio 4 play, the book The Secret Diary of Adrian Mole, Aged 13¾, is released; it sells 1.9 million copies in three years.
unknown dates
La Bicyclette bleue (The Blue Bicycle) by Régine Deforges is a runaway success and becomes one of France's all-time bestselling novels.
The Oxford Shakespeare, under the general editorship of Stanley Wells, begins publication.
Dorling Kindersley, formerly a book packager, begins publishing.

New books

Fiction
Brian Aldiss – Helliconia Spring (First of the Helliconia trilogy)
Isabel Allende – The House of the Spirits (La casa de los espíritus)
Isaac Asimov – Foundation's Edge
Jean M. Auel – The Valley of Horses
Lynne Reid Banks – The Indian in the Cupboard
René Barjavel – La Tempête
Julian Barnes – Before She Met Me
Michael Bishop – Blooded on Arachne
William Boyd – An Ice-Cream War
José Cardoso Pires – Balada da Praia dos Cães
Arthur C. Clarke – 2010: Odyssey Two
Bernard Cornwell – Sharpe's Company
L. Sprague de Camp – The Virgin of Zesh & The Tower of Zanid
L. Sprague de Camp and Lin Carter – Conan the Barbarian
August Derleth – The Solar Pons Omnibus
Marguerite Duras – The Malady of Death
Zee Edgell – Beka Lamb
Stanley Elkin – George Mills
Buchi Emecheta – Destination Biafra
Penelope Fitzgerald – At Freddie's
Ken Follett – The Man from St. Petersburg
John Fowles – Mantissa
Max Frisch – Bluebeard
John Gardner – For Special Services (James Bond novel)
Graham Greene – Monsignor Quixote
Robert A. Heinlein – Friday
L. Ron Hubbard – Battlefield Earth
Hammond Innes – The Black Tide
Kazuo Ishiguro – A Pale View of Hills
John Jakes – North and South
Thomas Keneally – Schindler's Ark
David Kesterton – The Darkling
Stephen King
Different Seasons
Pet Sematary
The Running Man
W. P. Kinsella – Shoeless Joe
Judith Krantz – Mistral's Daughter
Peter Kreeft – Between Heaven and Hell: A Dialog Somewhere Beyond Death with John F. Kennedy, C. S. Lewis, & Aldous Huxley
Derek Lambert – The Red Dove
Robert Ludlum – The Parsifal Mosaic
Colleen McCullough – An Indecent Obsession
Russell McCormmach – Night Thoughts of a Classical Physicist 
 Ngaio Marsh – Light Thickens
George R. R. Martin – Fevre Dream
James Merrill – The Changing Light at Sandover
James A. Michener – Space
Timothy Mo – Sour Sweet
Harry Mulisch – The Assault
Chris Mullin – A Very British Coup
Haruki Murakami (村上 春樹) – A Wild Sheep Chase (羊をめぐる冒険, Hitsuji o Meguru Bōken)
Gerald Murnane – The Plains
Shizuko Natsuki – Murder at Mt. Fuji (Wの悲劇, Daburyū no Higeki)
Ellis Peters – The Virgin in the Ice
T. R. Subba Rao – Durgaastamana
José Saramago – Memorial do Convento (translated as Baltasar and Blimunda)
Sidney Sheldon – Master of the Game
Anne Tyler – Dinner at the Homesick Restaurant
Kurt Vonnegut – Deadeye Dick
John Wain – Young Shoulders
Alice Walker – The Color Purple
Connie Willis and Cynthia Felice – Water Witch
Gene Wolfe – The Citadel of the Autarch
Roger Zelazny
Eye of Cat
Dilvish, the Damned
Stefan Zweig – The Post Office Girl (Rausch der Verwandlung – The Intoxication of Transformation)

Children and young people
Chris Van Allsburg – Ben's Dream
Gillian Cross – The Demon Headmaster (first in an eponymous series of six)
Roald Dahl – The BFG
Steve Jackson and Ian Livingstone – The Warlock of Firetop Mountain
Margaret Mahy – The Haunting
Michael Morpurgo – War Horse
Ruth Park – The Muddle-Headed Wombat Stays at Home
Bill Peet – The Luckiest One of All
Claude Roy (illustrated by Willi Glasauer) – The Cat who Talked in Spite of Himself (Le chat qui parlait malgré lui)
Viveca Sundvall – En ettas dagbok
Sue Townsend – The Secret Diary of Adrian Mole, Aged 13¾

Drama
Caryl Churchill – Top Girls
Andrea Dunbar – Rita, Sue and Bob Too
Peter Flannery – Our Friends in the North
Michael Frayn – Noises Off
Athol Fugard – "Master Harold"...and the Boys
Elfriede Jelinek – Clara S, musikalische Tragödie
Maryat Lee and the people of Hinton, West Virginia – A Double-Threaded Life: The Hinton Play
Doug Lucie – Hard Feelings
Stephen MacDonald – Not About Heroes
Frank McGuinness – The Factory Girls
Peter O'Donnell –  Mr. Fothergill's Murder
Tom Stoppard – The Real Thing
August Wilson – Ma Rainey's Black Bottom

Non-fiction
Irving Abella and Harold Troper – None is Too Many
Martin Amis – Invasion of the Space Invaders
Luc Brisson – Plato the Myth Maker (Platon, les mots et les mythes)
Beth Chatto – The Damp Garden
Mark Ellingham (editor) – The Rough Guide to Greece
Bruce Feirstein – Real Men Don't Eat Quiche
Eduardo Galeano – Memoria del fuego (Memory of Fire), vol. 1
Carol Gilligan – In a Different Voice
Sita Ram Goel – How I Became a Hindu
Traian Herseni – Teoria generală a vieții sociale omenești (The General Theory of Human Social Life, posthumous)
Rhys Isaac – The Transformation of Virginia, 1740–1790
Ryszard Kapuściński – Shah of Shahs (Szachinszach)
Gary Kinder – Victim: The Other Side of Murder
Audre Lorde – Zami: A New Spelling of My Name
Elaine Morgan – The Aquatic Ape
John Naisbitt – Megatrends
Fernando Pessoa (died 1935) – The Book of Disquiet (Livro do Desassossego: Composto por Bernardo Soares, ajudante de guarda-livros na cidade de Lisboa)
Tom Peters – In Search of Excellence
Erin Pizzey – Prone to Violence
Richard Rodriguez – Hunger of Memory: The Education of Richard Rodriguez (autobiography)
Richard Rorty – Consequences of Pragmatism
Jonathan Schell – The Fate of the Earth
Margaret Trudeau – Consequences
Rebecca West – 1900

Births
January 14 – Luke Wright, English poet
February 5 – Lauren Gunderson, American playwright
February 23 – Kateryna Mikhalitsyna, Ukrainian poet, children's writer, translator and editor
March 24 – Bryndís Björgvinsdóttir, Icelandic children's fiction writer
April 21 – Claybourne Elder, American actor, singer and writer
May 10 – Jeremy Gable, English-American playwright
June 29
 Colin Jost, American actor, screenwriter and comedian
 Ott Sepp, Estonian actor, singer, writer and television presenter
July 8 – James Graham, English playwright
July 16 – Angel David Revilla, Venezuelan journalist and writer

Deaths
January 16 – Ramón J. Sender, Spanish novelist (b. 1901)
February 5 – Ronald Welch (Ronald Oliver Felton) Welsh novelist and children's writer writing in English (born 1909)
February 11 – Albert Facey, Australian autobiographer (born 1894)
February 13 – Barbara Sleigh, English children's writer (born 1906)
February 18 – Dame Ngaio Marsh, New Zealand crime writer and theatre director (born 1895)
March 2 – Philip K. Dick, American writer (stroke; born 1928)
March 3 – Georges Perec, French novelist (lung cancer; born 1936)
March 6 – Ayn Rand, Russian-born American novelist, playwright and screenwriter (born 1905)
March 25 
 Goodman Ace, American humorist (born 1899) 
 Hugo Huppert, Austrian poet, writer and translator (born 1902)
March 27 
 Harriet Adams, American novelist (born 1892) 
 Ted Lewis, English crime novelist (born 1940)
May 10 – Peter Weiss, German writer and artist (born 1916)
June 6 – Kenneth Rexroth, American poet and critic (born 1905)
June 18
 Djuna Barnes, American writer (born 1892)
 John Cheever, American novelist and short story writer (born 1912)
July 3 – Engvald Bakkan, Norwegian novelist and children's writer (born 1897)
August 6 – S. K. Pottekkatt, Indian writer (born 1913)
September 14 – John Gardner, American novelist (motorcycle accident, born 1933)
October 7 – Alejandro Núñez Alonso, Spanish novelist (born 1905)
October 22 – Savitri Devi, French-born writer and philosopher (born 1905)
October 30 – Iryna Vilde, Ukrainian writer (born 1907)
November 5 – Theresa Hak Kyung Cha, Korean-American novelist (murdered; born 1951)
December 5 – Caryl Brahms, English critic, novelist and journalist (born 1901)
December 21 – Ants Oras, Estonian writer (born 1900)
December 24 – Louis Aragon, French poet and writer (born 1897)

Awards
Nobel Prize in Literature: Gabriel García Márquez

Australia
The Australian/Vogel Literary Award: Brian Castro, Birds of Passage; Nigel Krauth, Matilda, My Darling
Kenneth Slessor Prize for Poetry: Fay Zwicky, Kaddish and Other Poems
Miles Franklin Award: Rodney Hall, Just Relations

Canada
See 1982 Governor General's Awards for a complete list of winners and finalists for those awards.

France
Prix Goncourt: Dominique Fernandez, Dans la main de l'Ange
Prix Médicis French: Jean-François Josselin, L'Enfer et Cie
Prix Médicis International: Umberto Eco, The Name of the Rose

Spain
Miguel de Cervantes Prize: Luis Rosales

United Kingdom
Booker Prize: Thomas Keneally, Schindler's Ark
Carnegie Medal for children's literature: Margaret Mahy, The Haunting
Cholmondeley Award: Basil Bunting, Herbert Lomas, William Scammell
Eric Gregory Award: Steve Ellis, Jeremy Reed, Alison Brackenbury, Neil Astley, Chris O'Neill, Joseph Bristow, John Gibbens, James Lasdun
James Tait Black Memorial Prize for fiction: Bruce Chatwin, On the Black Hill
James Tait Black Memorial Prize for biography: Richard Ellmann, James Joyce
Whitbread Best Book Award: Bruce Chatwin, On the Black Hill

United States
Agnes Lynch Starrett Poetry Prize: Lawrence Joseph, Shouting at No One
American Academy of Arts and Letters Gold Medal for Fiction, Bernard Malamud
Nebula Award for Best Novel: Michael Bishop, No Enemy But Time
Newbery Medal for children's literature: Nancy Willard, A Visit to William Blake's Inn
Pulitzer Prize for Drama: Charles Fuller, A Soldier's Play
Pulitzer Prize for Fiction: John Updike – Rabbit Is Rich
Pulitzer Prize for Poetry: Sylvia Plath: The Collected Poems

Elsewhere
Hugo Award for Best Novel: Downbelow Station by C. J. Cherryh
Premio Nadal: Fernando Arrabal, La torre herida por un rayo

References

 
Years of the 20th century in literature